Omroep MAX is a broadcaster in the Netherlands, aimed at viewers over the age of 50. MAX is broadcast on NPO 1, NPO 2, NPO 3 and NPO Zapp.

References

External links 
 

Dutch public broadcasting organisations
Television channels and stations established in 2002
Netherlands Public Broadcasting
Dutch-language television networks
2002 establishments in the Netherlands